Hydnellum auratile is a tooth fungus in the family Bankeraceae. The caps are initially bright orange with a white rim, and have a felt-like surface. On the cap underside, the hymenium has hanging orange spines with whitish tips. These spines extend a ways down the length of the short stipe. The flesh is orange in both the cap and stipe. In mass, the spores are brown. Microscopically, they measure 4–5 by 3.5–4.5 µm and have short, rounded tubercles on the surface. The widespread Hydnellum aurantiacum is a close lookalike, but can be distinguished by having a white to buff cap, dull orange to brown flesh, and white spines.

Hydnellum auratile was first described as a species of Hydnum by German mycologist Max Britzelmayr in 1891. Rudolph Arnold Maas Geesteranus transferred it to Hydnellum in 1959. The fungus is widely spread in Europe, and has also been reported from the Pacific Northwest region of North America. It is considered endangered in Switzerland.

References

External links

Fungi described in 1891
Fungi of Europe
Fungi of North America
Inedible fungi
auratile
Taxa named by Max Britzelmayr